Aouk National Park is a national park in Chad. It covers an area of 7400 km2.

Although the park did not thrive with the same protection as Zakouma National Park, it is still home to a huge and impressive mix of mammals and birds. It is a popular place for safari excursions.

References 

National parks of Chad